Enchelycore tamarae is a moray eel found in coral reefs around India. It was first named by Prokofiev in 2005, and might feed on crustaceans.

References

tamarae
Fish described in 2005